The 2022–23 World Rugby Sevens Series  the 24th annual series of rugby sevens tournaments for men's national teams. The Sevens Series has been run by World Rugby since 1999. This series also, for the third time, doubled as a qualifier for the Olympic Games, with the top four countries, excluding hosts France, qualifying automatically for the 2024 Olympic Sevens.

Core teams
The core teams eligible to participate in all tournaments for 2022–23 :

 was promoted to core team status by winning the 2022 Challenger Series.

Tour venues
The eleven-event schedule for the series :

Standings

The points awarded to teams at each event, as well as the overall season totals, are shown in the table below. Points for the event winners are indicated in bold. An asterisk (*) indicates a tied placing. A dash (—) is recorded where a team did not compete.

Source: World Rugby
{| class="wikitable" style="font-size:92%;"
|-
!colspan=2| Legend
|-
|style="width:4.5em;"|No colour
|- 
|style="background:#fdd;"|Pink
| in 2022–23.
|- 
|style="background:#fbb;"|Red
| the lowest placed core team after Round 10 in 2022–23.
|- 
|style="background:#ffc;"|Yellow
|Not a core team
|-
|-
|}
Notes

Placings summary
Tallies of top-four placings in tournaments during the 2022–23 series, by team:

Player statistics

Scoring

Updated: 12 December 2022

Updated: 13 December 2022

Performance 

 

Key: T: Tackles (1 pt), B: Line breaks (3 pts), O: Offloads (2 pts), C: Carries (1 pt)

Tournaments

Hong Kong 2022

Dubai

Cape Town

Hamilton

Sydney

Los Angeles

Vancouver

See also
 2022–23 World Rugby Women's Sevens Series

References

External links
Official site

 
World Rugby Sevens Series